Winterborne Houghton is a village and civil parish in north Dorset, England. In the 2011 census the parish had 82 households and a population of 183. In 2001 the population was 195.

The name "Winterborne" derives from the River Winterborne, which has its source here.
The river only flows overground during the winter, hence the name. To the east is Winterborne Stickland and the river flows on to this village, eventually joining the River Stour. To the southwest is Milton Abbas.

Residents of Winterborne Houghton used to be known as "Houghton Owls", in reference to the story of a villager who, when calling for help having got lost in the woods, mistook the calls of owls for answering human voices. In his book Dorset Villages Roland Gant posits the theory that Thomas Hardy used this tale as inspiration for the scene where Joseph Poorgrass gets lost in Yalbury Wood in Far from the Madding Crowd.

Church
The village church is named after St Andrew and is a Grade II listed building, being so designated on 14 July 1955. It was designed by Thomas Henry Wyatt and built during 1861–62. It is in the Perpendicular style and faced with flint with a tiled roof. It has a simple plan with nave, chancel, north aisle and south porch. The tower is on the west end and is built in two stages with a battlemented parapet. Internally, the nave has a hammer beam roof and the chancel a wagon roof. The fifteenth century font has a carved octagonal bowl on an octagonal stem, and the other fittings are nineteenth century.

Higher Houghton
Higher Houghton is a smaller village (similar to Winterborne Clenston) located near the top of Winterborne Houghton. It is only accessible through the road from Winterborne Houghton. The village used to have stables and would offer horse riding sessions. Unfortunately, the stables closed down in 2020 due to poor business as a result of the pandemic. Occasionally, cross country horse races are held in fields in Higher Houghton.

Houghton Down
Houghton Down is a series of fields located in the west of Winterborne Houghton. It is accessible from the Bridleway (Footpath) leading to Milton Abbas.

Amenities
There used to be a post office in the village with a shop but this closed down sometime in the 1990's. There is a fish farm in the village called 'Houghton Springs Fish Farm'. This farm provides fish to many restaurants and companies around the UK. As a result of lockdown in 2020, the fish farm started selling fish directly from its farm to locals in the village as many restaurants were closed as a result of the pandemic. This proved popular with residents and they still continue to sell the fish at their farm to this day! To the west of the village there is a small pond called 'The Millennium Pond'. Its called this because it was built in 2000 to commemorate the new millennium. In 2002, the pond won a design award. In the center of the village there is a bench with a small greenery area and a telephone box which is still operating (Only under the use of a BT Card as coins are no longer accepted). In 2017, BT reported that the phone box had not been used for a long period of time and had planned to remove it completely but this didn't happen. Yet again in 2020, BT reported the same issue and wanted to remove the phone box. Fortunately, the village council declined this request as they state that 'the phone box is a key piece in our village'. In 2021, a book swap system had been added into the phone box to make use of the premises. This book swap proved very popular with residents in the village. Unfortunately, at the end of 2021 BT requested that the book swap should be removed from the telephone box as it is obstructing the standing area in the telephone box. Due to this, the book swap system moved into St Andrews Church. At the top of the village, there is an orchard called the 'Jubilee Orchard' as it was put there on the queens Jubilee. It is situated between the footpath leading to Winterborne Stickland.

References

External links 

Villages in Dorset